According to the official ethnographic data of the Republic of Indonesia, there are at least 1,340 recognised distinct ethnic groups who inhabit more than 18,300 islands of Indonesia.

In addition, according to the official national law of Indonesia (especially in 1999 Law on Human Rights), there is no superiority of particular ethnic group; all ethnics in Indonesia are treated equally and protected by the laws.

History

Early official data
After the 1928 Youth Pledge declaration momentum, the official census by the citizens started to emerged, and along with that, the ethnographics data of Indonesia was first officially published through the 1930 Population Census (abbreviated as SP 1930) by the local Indonesians in Java under the Dutch colonial supervision.

Termination
In early independence of Indonesia, the data collecting process was temporarily stoped especially during the New Order era (in 1966–1998) due to the dictatorship of Soeharto (the second president of Indonesia) who impose his political views to not including non-Native Indonesians (especially targeted to the Chinese Indonesians) as part of 'Indonesians' due to the statement and policy of Mao Zedong on Chinese-descent (partially or fully) who stated that all people related to Chinese are nationally People's Republic Chinese, while in fact, the independence of Indonesia was earlier than the People's Republic of China, and the Chinese-descent people have already miggrated and settled in Indonesia since ancient times. The Chinese-descent people in Indonesia have some sort of difficulty to understand the situation and hard to assigned themselves as either nationally Indonesian or People's Republic Chinese; due to these social phenomenon, the ethnographic data collection proccess was considered as ‘political taboo’ since it was deemed as one of the government's tools to break the unity of Indonesian nation.

Revival
After almost 70 years later, in post-Soeharto era, the government of Indonesia started to officially active again to continue its paused population census (which also including the ethnographic census) and the 2000 Population Census (abbreviated as SP 2000) officially published in 2000. Since then, it was officially set that the population census will be officially published every 10 years (a decade), thus being said, the 2010 Population Census (abbreviated as SP 2010) and 2020 Population Census (abbreviated as SP 2020) are already available to observe the demographics of Indonesia, particularly in ethnography sector.

Current
The latest official ethnographic data of Indonesia shows that at least 1,340 distict ethnic groups which inhabited the 18,000 islands of Indonesia. The collaborative ethnographic researchs also shows that each island of Indonesia has its own indigenous ethnic community, but their existence was reduced to circa 1,400 due to numerous factors, and one of them due to European colonizations (e.g. genocide, etc.).

Classification

Native and/or official classification 
According to the official laws, the classification of ethnicity is strongly adhered to the anthropology, what defined as an ethnic in Indonesia is "unified social community that are distinctive to another community based on the lineages (blood, ancestral origin homelands, etc), awareness of identity, cultures (not limited to folk religious view), and spoken languages". Those  itself have its own subgroup (either as tribe or ethnic) that might have its own distinctive clans, cultural customs, etc. One of the well-known native/first nations of Indonesia (subnations of Indonesian nation) are the Batak, a multiethnic group which had its own unique defined distinctive ethnic groups, namely the Angkola, Dairi, Karo, Mandailing, Pakpak, Simalungun, Toba, Alas, Kluet, Singkil, etc alongwith their own , native Batak writing system, etc. However, not all ethnics of Indonesia are originally a nation, some are ultimately a tribe that was branched out from its initial ancestral nation, these 'branched out' groups usually characterized by the absence of clans, traditional native writing system, and folk religious view, as well as adoption of cultures and traditions from different group (one of the extreme cases usually characterized by the adoption of the cultures of unrelated groups of different ancestral lands, etc). 

Unlike most countries, the native classification for ethnicity in Indonesia was never rely or adhered to any racial grouping, since racism has always been deemed by the Native Indonesians as the product of colonization and newly proposed European-centered vision that essentially has no sturdy definition and benchmarks.

Non-native classification
According to European/Western/White/Non-native Indonesian classification, the ethnic groups of Indonesia could be defined through racial grouping, namely continental-based racial grouping (e.g. Asian, African, etc), skincolor-based racial grouping (e.g. brown, yellow, black, etc), and skin complexion-based grouping (e.g. dark, light, etc). For instance, the Western Indonesia predominantly inhabited by the light yellow skin Asians, meanwhile the Eastern Indonesia predominantly inhabited by the dark brown (and black) skin Asians which later termed as Austronesians, Australasians, Austromelanesians, Melanesians, etc. However, it is best to take note that those are only European-based hypothetical classification, none of Native Indonesians called or identified themselves as one of those racial grouping since those are new proposed ideology that did not really represent the native identity nor the real proven historical origin of each native Indonesian ethnic groups. Rather than race grouping, ethnics of Indonesia are adhered to proven historical native classification.

Indigenous 

All native ethnic groups of Indonesia could identify and still resides in their ancestral homeland origin; however, due to multiple migration (e.g. national transmigration program, tribal wars, etc.), some significant proportions of ethnic groups might also resides outside of their ancestral origin regions.

In Bali
There are two main native ethnic group of the Bali Island, namely the Balinese and Bali Aga. Both are the indigenous of Bali, but the Balinese are the one who already mixed with Javanese; thus, in terms of lineage, customs, clans, and cultures are exhibited significant differences.

In Java
The indigenous of the Java Island are commonly called as the Javans, these community consist of several ethnics namely the Javanese itself which mostly native to the central, southern, and eastern regions of Java, the Tengger which native to the Tengger Mountains region, the Osing which native to easternmost region of Java, the Banyumasan (or  Ngapak) native to northern regions of Java, the Sundanese native to western regions of Java, the Baduy native to the regions alongside the Cibaduyut, the Banten native to westernmost region of Java, the Cirebonese native to Cirebon and its adjacent regions, the Betawi native to northern West Java, and Kalang native to central Java.

In Kalimantan
Some ethnics branched out from Dayak are mostly lived in coastal regions, namely the Banjar native to Banjar Region, the Kutai native to Kutai Kartanegara, the Paser native to Paser regions, the Tidung native to Tana Tidung, etc.

In Madura
The Madurese are the native ethnic of the Madura Island. However, there are several subethnic groups of Madurese namely the Baweans who settled in Bawean Island and Pandalungan which mostly dominated Jember and its adjacent regions in the island of Java.

In Maluku
The archipelago of Maluku ( Moluccas) are inhabited by several indigenous ethnics, namely the Alfur native to Alfur regions, the Ambonese native to Ambon Island, the Nuaulu native to soutern regions of Seram Island, the Manusela and Wemale native to Manusela regions of Central Maluku, the Tanimbar native to Tanimbar Islands, etc.

In Nusa Tenggara
The Lesser Sunda Islands are natively called as Nusa Tenggara Islands. There are numerous distinct ethnic groups inhabit different islands, namely the Sasak which native to Lombok Island, the Kangeanese native to Kangean Island, the Sumbawan and Bima native to Sumbawa Island, the Manggarai native to Manggarai regions, the Lamaholot native to eastern Flores, the Atoni and Tetun native to western regions of Timor Island, the Helong native to Kupang and its adjacent regions, Rote native to the Rote Island, the Savu native to Savu Island, the Sumba native to Sumba Island, Alorese native to Alor Islands, etc.

In Papua
The western regions of the New Guinea Island is home to various indigenous ethnics, the Asmat are native to Asmat regions, the Dani native to the Jayawijaya Mountainous regions, the Bauzi native to regions alongside the Danau-danau Plains, the Amungme native to western regions of Jayawijaya, etc.

In Sulawesi
The natives of Sulawesi are collectively known as Sulawesi (or Celebesian in outdated English terminology), some of the notable ethnics are the Bugis, Makassar, and Mandar which native to southern regions of Sulawesi, the multiethnic of Minahasan native to northern regions Sulawesi, the Torajan native to Tana Toraja, the Gorontalo native to Gorontalo and its adjacent regions, etc.

Sumatra
The indigenous of the Sumatra Island are commonly called as the Sumatrans, there are numerous ethnics in Sumatra which exhibits distinct characteristics to one another. Some of the ethnics are including the Abung, Ogan, Komering, and Lampung which native to southernmost region of Sumatra, the Palembang native to southeastern region of Sumatra, the Musi native to regions alongside the Musi River, the Basemah native to south central regions of Sumatra, the Rejang native to Rejang Lebong regions, Kerinci native to Kerinci Mountainous regions, Minangkabau native to Minangkabau Highlands, the multiethnic of Batak native to central and northern regions Sumatra, the Acehnese native to northernmost regions of Sumatra, the Gayo native to central northern highlands of Sumatra, the Melayu native to easternmost coastal regions of Sumatra, etc.

Non-indigenous 
Throughout the Indonesian history, various ethnic groups of foreign origin spread throughout Indonesia in several migration waves, and usually established themselves in urban centres, seldom settling rural parts of the country.

Arab Indonesians

 

The Arabs are one of the people who migrated to Indonesia since ancient times from different regions of Middle East (notably Saudi Arabia and Yemen), some of notable ethnic groups of Arabs in Indonesia are including the Bedouin (also commonly known in Indonesia as), Hadhrami (also commonly known in Indonesia as ), and Sabaeans (also commonly known in Indonesia as ). In the island of Java, they are mostly concentrated around Puncak of Bogor, Pasar Kliwon of Surakarta, Ampel of Northern Surabaya, Jakarta, Malang, Probolinggo, etc.

Chinese Indonesians

The Chinese are one of the most significant people of foreign origin in Indonesia. These community are mostly concentrated in locations natively known as ꦏꦩ꧀ꦥꦸꦁꦕꦶꦤ or ꦥꦼꦕꦶꦤꦤ꧀ in urban coastal regions of Java Island (mainly in northern Jakarta), Kalimantan Island (mainly in Pontianak), Sumatra Island (mainly in Medan, Riau, Palembang, and Jambi), Riau Islands, Bangka Island (mainly in northern Bangka), etc. 

Due to long progressive historical ties between Indonesia and People's Republic of China (as well as Republic of China (ROC,  Taiwan)), the intermarriage is an unavoidable phenomenon occured within the society. In Java Island, the mixed people of Native Javanese and Non-native Javanese (which also include the Chinese) are natively called as the ꦥꦼꦫꦤꦏꦤ꧀ community (e.g. the Peranakans of Benteng, Lasem, etc.), etymologically Old Javanese in origin, derived from the basic word of ꦲꦤꦏ꧀, which literally means "child" (as in passim); eventhough it was originally a neutral term encompass all mixed people on the island of Java, nowadays the  terminology closely associated with Chinese Javanese (part of modern-day Chinese Indonesians) due to the significant population of Chinese-descent people (compared to another 'mixed people' community) in Java. In Sumatra Island, the mixed people of Native Sumatrans and Chinese are natively identified as the community of Kacukan (in Palembang) or Kacauan , which literally means "blended". Meanwhile in Warmar Island of northern Aru Islands, the mixed people of Native Aru and Chinese are commonly known as the community of Jar (in Aru), which literally means "mixed".

Indian Indonesians

 

Indians are amongst one of the earliest people who travelled to Indonesia to expand their business. Some of the notable ethnic groups of Indian origin are including the Indo-Aryan of Madra (also commonly known in Indonesia as ), Marathi (they originates mainly from Mumbai, thus these people also commonly known in Indonesia as ), Tamil, etc. Significant population of Indian Indonesians are centered in Sumatra Island (mainly in North Sumatra) and Pasar Baru of Jakarta in Java Island.

Japanese Indonesians

Japanese are one of the notable East Asians who migrated to Indonesia since ancient times, one of the reasons is to built the business with the Native Indonesians. As the business has been going back-and-forth from the islands of Japan to Indonesia, some ethnic group of Japan such as Okinawan of Ryukyuan are also influenced by the Native Indonesian cultures, such as in culinary tradition where the チャンプルー being a staple in Okinawa regions which derived from the ancient Javanese cuisine of ꦤꦱꦶꦕꦩ꧀ꦥꦸꦂ. During the World War II, the migration wave of Japanese to Indonesia also increase when Japan started to expand their power in Indonesia, especially to the islands of Java and Bali where the Native Japanese and Native Indonesians used to make business cooperation since ancient times. Nowadays, the existence of Japanese Indonesians (Indonesians of fully or partially Japanese-descent) are still exist in several regions of Bali and Java, where the ラーメン also become one of the most popular Japanese-origin noodle culinary heritage which can be easily found in malls or shopping centers all across Indonesia (especially Bali and Java).

Korean Indonesians

 
Korean Indonesians are referring to Indonesians of Korean-descent (partially or fully) from both northern and southern regions of Korea. As one of the ethnic group of East Asian in origin, the existence of Koreans in Indonesia could be linked to the business trade activity between Native Indonesians and Native Koreans. The Koreans has been co-existed in Indonesia since ancient times alongwith Chinese and Japanese, and their main settlements were and still in the Indonesian island of Java. Korean Indonesians are also one of the people who showed great support for the independence of Indonesia, 양칠성 or natively known as ꦏꦺꦴꦩꦫꦸꦣꦶꦤ꧀ or 梁川七星 is one of the Korean Indonesians figures who fought for Indonesia during the Japanese colonialization era. Some notable Korean-origin heritages in Indonesia usually can be found side-by-side with Japanese (or even Chinese) cultures.

Netherland Indonesians

 
As one of the longest former colonies of the Netherlands, several ethnic groups of Netherlands origin also exist in Indonesia, such as the Dutch and Frisians. The mixed people of native Indonesians and Netherlands also emerged in both Indonesia and Netherlands especially in the era of Dutch East Indies, which they classified themselves as a unique community group called the Indo people (colloquially also known as the Indos). Nowadays they (especially the Indos) live mostly in Jakarta. As of 2011, an estimated 124,000 Indos were residing outside of the Netherlands (which including Indonesia).

Portuguese Indonesians

 
According to historical colonial records of Indonesia, Portugal are one of the European countries who came to Indonesia as colonizer. Portuguese (also commonly known in Indonesia as ) are the largest ethnic group of Portugal origin that still exist in Indonesia, its descendants also married to Native Indonesians which resulted the existence of Mardijkers, which are the Portuguese-descent people that are known for its historical support for the independence of Indonesia, however, the Mardijkers are not really a direct descent of Portuguese but already mixed with Indians as well, thus Mardijkers are basically the 'mixed people' of Portuguese, Indians, and Indonesians; the name Mardijk itself is a self-designated name which derived from the Sanskrit मार्डीक or महर्द्धिक, which commonly referred as "freedom" corresponds to the independence of Indonesia. Some notable regions with significant Portuguese-descent population are located in Jakarta on Java Island, where they resides in settlements natively known as ꦏꦩ꧀ꦥꦸꦁꦠꦸꦒꦸ, and some regions in Timor Island.

Statistics

2010 
Number and percentage of population of ethnic groups with more than a million members according to the 2010 census.
 

The proportions of Indonesian ethnic groups according to the (2000 census) are as follows. Some ethnic groups which are now recognized as being distinct were subsumed under larger umbrella groups up until 2001. Since the 2010 census, they are counted separately.

See also 
 Demographics of Indonesia
 Ethnic groups in Asia

References

Notes

Citations

Bibliography